The Monroe County Advocate & Democrat is a newspaper headquartered in Sweetwater, Tennessee.

References

External links

 Monroe County Advocate & Democrat

Monroe County, Tennessee
Newspapers published in Tennessee